"Sweet the Sting" is a song written and recorded by Tori Amos, released as the second single from the album The Beekeeper (2005). Following the trend of her several previous singles, "Sweet the Sting" was released as a promotional single only, with physical CDs produced for radio stations.

"Sweet the Sting" appeared on radio stations throughout the summer of 2005.

Song info

On the limited edition of The Beekeeper, Amos explains the inspiration and correlation with one of the album's themes:

Track list
 "Sweet the Sting" (Album Version) – 4:14

Releases

Promo CD
Promotional CDs for "Sweet the Sting" were produced for radio stations, but dispersed sparsely, making it difficult to locate a copy of the single. Since the song was not re-mixed or edited for single release, a separate digital download of the single was not made available because the same version appeared on the previously released album.

The promotional CDs released contain only the album version of the song, with no accompanying B-sides or bonus material.

Music video

The music video for "Sweet the Sting" was recorded in 2005 and directed by Alex Smith. The sequence of the video takes place during a rehearsal with Amos's gospel choir, with whom she worked to record certain tracks on The Beekeeper, as well as at another location, showing Amos interacting with her crew, playing the piano alone in a small room, and singing without the gospel choir. Most of the video focuses on Amos playing the B3 Hammond organ and singing, making the "Sweet the Sting" a simpler, documentary-type video, compared to her other videos which often include a narrative story with elaborate props and technical camera work.

The music video for "Sweet the Sting" has been released on iTunes and subsequently on Amos's video compilation, Fade to Red (2006).

Miscellaneous
"Sweet the Sting" is one of three tracks from The Beekeeper subsequently included on Amos's 5-disc box set, A Piano: The Collection (2006).

Personnel
Tori Amos – acoustic piano, B3 Hammond organ, vocals, producer
Matt Chamberlain – drums
Jon Evans –  bass guitar
Mac Aladdin – acoustic and electric guitar
London Community Gospel Choir – background vocals

Tori Amos songs
2005 singles
Epic Records singles
2004 songs
Songs written by Tori Amos